Radya Caldaya (Syriac: ܪܕܥܐ ܦܠܕܥܐ ) is a monthly Chaldean seasonal general cultural magazine that is published by the Chaldean Culture Society of Ankawa, Kurdistan Region. The magazine is written generally in three languages; it began with Syriac, then continues with Kurdish, and ends with Arabic.

External links
 Official website

Arabic-language magazines
Cultural magazines
Magazines published in Iraq
Kurdish-language magazines
Mass media in Ankawa
Monthly magazines
Magazines with year of establishment missing
Assyrian culture